Turkey participated in Eurovision Song Contest 1996. Turkey was represented by Şebnem Paker with the song "Beşinci Mevsim" written by Selma Çuhacı and composed by Levent Çoker.

Before Eurovision

19. Eurovision Şarkı Yarışması Türkiye Finali 
19. Eurovision Şarkı Yarışması Türkiye Finali was the national final format developed by TRT in order to select Turkish entry for the Eurovision Song Contest 1996.

Competing entries
In order to select entries for the national final, TRT opened the submission period for interested artists and composers to submit their entries. 96 songs were ultimately submitted, from which, 10 were selected by jury panel for the national final.

Final 
The final took place on 17 February 1996 at the TRT Studios in Ankara, hosted by Bülent Özveren. Ten songs competed and the winner was determined by an expert jury.

At Eurovision
On the night of the contest Şebnem Paker performed 1st in the running order preceding United Kingdom. At the close of the voting the song had received 57 points placing Turkey 12th. The Turkish jury awarded its 12 points to Ireland. The members of the Turkish jury included Nursal Tekin, Taner Dedeoğlu, Erol Evgin, Melih Kibar, Sonat Bağcan, Nejat Çarkacı, Pınar Karakoç, İlter Yeşilay, Meral Geray, Pınar Türkoğlu, Müveddet Nil Özbay, Fatma Asuman Yıldırım, Murat Karahan, Merter Beton, Murat Özcan and Arsel Aktaç.

Voting

Qualifying round

Final

References

1996
Countries in the Eurovision Song Contest 1996
Eurovision